Henry Goodman (born 23 April 1950) is a RADA trained British actor. He has appeared on television and radio, in film and in the theatre.

Early life
He attended the Central Foundation Boys' School and joined the Royal Academy of Dramatic Art, London, in 1969.

Career

Television
In 2003 Goodman guest starred in the ITV series Foyle's War as corrupt American industrialist Howard Paige in “Fifty Ships”, the opening episode of Season 2 of the British TV crime drama set in WWII. In 2013 he played the role of Sir Humphrey Appleby in the remake of Yes, Prime Minister which was launched on the Gold television channel.

Theatre
Goodman appeared on Broadway in three shows. He briefly replaced Nathan Lane in The Producers in 2002, but was fired after one month due to creative differences with Mel Brooks. The following year he returned to Broadway in Tartuffe. 

In 2010 he played the role of Sir Humphrey Appleby in the stage version of Yes, Prime Minister at the Chichester Festival Theatre and later at the Gielgud Theatre, in London's West End from 17 September 2010.

In 2012 he played the title role in The Resistible Rise of Arturo Ui in Chichester and then in the West End to critical acclaim.

In 2015 he played the title role in Ben Jonson's Jacobean comedy Volpone at the Royal Shakespeare Company, directed by Trevor Nunn and co-starring Matthew Kelly and Miles Richardson. His previous RSC appearance was in 2003 as Richard III.

In 2017 he played Lucian Freud in Looking at Lucian, written by Alan Franks, at the Ustinov Studio at Theatre Royal, Bath. Of this part, he said "I share an intense hunger to want theatre to be as meaningful as he wanted painting to be."

In 2022, he played Hercule Poirot in Ken Ludwig’s adaptation of Murder on the Orient Express at the Chichester Festival Theatre and the Theatre Royal, Bath. He was nominated for a UK Theatre Award for his performance.

Film
In 1999 Goodman played a memorable cameo role as the Ritz concierge in Notting Hill. He portrayed a HYDRA doctor in the 2014 film Captain America: The Winter Soldier, though he was not listed in the credits. He played the character again, now named Dr. List, on the second season of the TV show Agents of S.H.I.E.L.D., and in the 2015 film Avengers: Age of Ultron.

Radio
Goodman is also a respected radio actor. He portrayed Pierre Beaumarchais in the BBC Radio 4 series Beaumarchais in 1996, "Melvin" in The  Attractive Young Rabbi (BBC Radio 4, 1999-2002) and Leopold Bloom in BBC Radio 4's all-day adaptation of James Joyce's Ulysses for 'Bloomsday' in 2012. He has also played author and chemist Primo Levi and a large number of other, often Jewish, characters on Radio 4.

Awards and reputation
His awards include the Olivier Award for Best Actor in a Musical playing Charles Guiteau in Assassins at the Donmar Warehouse directed by Sam Mendes in 1993, and the Olivier Award for Best Actor for Shylock in The Merchant of Venice at the National Theatre directed by Trevor Nunn in 2000. He has also been nominated for an Olivier Award for Best Actor in a Musical in 1998 for Chicago, London Critics Circle Theatre Award for Best Actor (The Merchant of Venice), and Theatre Awards UK for Best Performance in a Play in 2012 (The Resistible Rise of Arturo Ui).

In his autobiography, Antony Sher says Goodman's Shylock is "quite simply the best". He reprised his role for a television film which was released in 2004.

Personal life
Goodman is Jewish. He has five siblings. He is married to Sue Parker, a choreographer and dance director.

Filmography

Television

The Golden Bowl 
Bust 
This is David Lander 
London's Burning
Three Up, Two Down
Gentlemen and Players
Rules of Engagement
After the War 
Act of Will 
Capital City
Screen Two
El C.I.D. 
Chain 
The Bill 
The Gravy Train Goes East (1991)
Maigret
Zorro 
Lovejoy 
Rides
99-1 
Performance, BBC — Measure for Measure, 1994
Smith & Jones
Cold Lazarus  (1996)
American Voices
Murder Rooms: Mysteries of the Real Sherlock Holmes 
Masterpiece Theatre — Broken Glass, TV film, 1996
Dalziel and Pascoe
Spooks, (2002, "The Lesser of Two Evils")
Trust
Foyle's War (2003)
Keen Eddie, (2004, Rabbi Mendelssohn, "Who Wants to Be in a Club That Would Have Me as a Member?", Episode 11)
M.I.T.: Murder Investigation Team
Murder in Suburbia , "The Wedding", Series 2 – Episode 3
Mumbai Calling, (2007, Pilot)
Falcon 
Yes, Prime Minister, (2010) 6 episodes
Midsomer Murders , (2013)
New Tricks, (2013, "Cry Me a River", Series 10, Episode 5)
Playhouse Presents , Nixon's the One, (2014)
Penny Dreadful, (2014, "Grand Guignol")
Agents of S.H.I.E.L.D. – Dr. List
Snatch – Saul Gold

Film
Sources: Rotten Tomatoes TCM AllMovie

 Murderers Among Us: The Simon Wiesenthal Story
 Secret Weapon
 Son of the Pink Panther
 Degas and Pissarro Fall Out
 Mary Reilly
 Private Parts
 The Saint
 Notting Hill
 Arabian Nights
 Dirty Tricks
 The Final Curtain
 Hamilton Mattress
 The Mayor of Casterbridge
 The Life and Death of Peter Sellers
 Churchill: The Hollywood Years
 Green Street
 Shakespeare's Happy Endings
 Colour Me Kubrick: A True...Ish Story 
 Out on a Limb 
 The Damned United
 Taking Woodstock
 The Last Days of Lehman Brothers
 The Road to Coronation Street
 Codebreaker
 The Half-Light
 Wonder
 The Challenger Disaster
 Captain America: The Winter Soldier – Dr. List
 Woman in Gold
 Avengers: Age of Ultron – Dr. List
 De Surprise
 Altamira
 Love is Thicker Than Water
 El Elegido
 Their Finest (2016)
 The Limehouse Golem (2016)
 Two Words (2018)
 Sundown (2021)

References

External links
Interview with Henry Goodman on SomethingJewish 
 

1950 births
Living people
People from Whitechapel
Male actors from London
People educated at Central Foundation Boys' School
Alumni of RADA
English male musical theatre actors
English male stage actors
Critics' Circle Theatre Award winners
Laurence Olivier Award winners
Royal Shakespeare Company members
Jewish British male actors